Phil Starr (March 31, 1932 - October 18, 2005), birth name Arthur James Fuller, was a gay cabaret comedian, singer, mainstay and regular feature of the London and English south coast gay scene during a career spanning from the 1950s, until his sudden and unexpected death. Famous within his genre and locale, Starr's act was typically old school: comic, lengthy shaggy dog stories, often culminating in a hilarious, unexpected twist.

External links 
Memorial Fan Site
Tributes to a Starr of Drag The Argus (Brighton) October 20, 2005.
Phil Starr Tribute, special supplement to  GScene (paper and online magazine), November 2005.
BBC Archives Twitter account featuring footage of Phil Starr and an audio interview, circa 1967

1932 births
2005 deaths